Superior Aviation may refer to:

Superior Aviation Beijing, a Chinese aviation holding company
Superior Aviation (airline), a US-based airline